Exshaw is a hamlet in Alberta, Canada within Municipal District (MD) of Bighorn No. 8.

The hamlet was once located within Rocky Mountains Park later Banff National Park, with the original park entrance being only a couple miles east of Exshaw.

History 
Sir Sanford Fleming named Exshaw after his son-in-law, E. William Exshaw (15 February 1866, Bordeaux – 16 March 1927; of Anglo-Irish descent; and sailing Olympic gold medalist at the Paris 1900 Summer Olympics), who with Fleming helped establish the Western Canada Cement and Coal Company. William Exshaw visited in 1908 when a banquet was held in his honour by the staff of WCC&C.

Robert D. Hassan, an American mechanical engineer, was hired in 1906 to build a mill in Exshaw, Alberta for the Western Canada Cement and Coal Company. He was assisted in building the plant by Alexander Graham Christie, 1880–1964, a mechanical and electrical engineering graduate from the University of Toronto, who later in 1909 became associate professor of engineering at the University of Wisconsin, and in 1914 joined the School of Engineering at Johns Hopkins University in Baltimore, Maryland.

Although the original cement plant was further west, the community has had a large plant for many years. The cement plant, now owned by Lafarge North America, is the main industry in the community. The limestone is quarried on the mountain north of the plant.

A number of other plants and quarries are in the area east and west. West is Baymag calcined magnesium oxide plant, and east, Graymont lime and limestone products plant.

Due to the need for more capital a new company was incorporated in 1906 and a new plant completed by 1908. A peak on Door Jam Mountain, above the hamlet and plant, is named after him. The Loder name is still connected with the area.

Roy Zeller ( 1896-1947) from Kitchener, Ontario, and married to Lucille, 1896–1982, established together a garage in Exshaw about 1926. During the summers Lucille ran the Bowfort Service Station and tea room nine miles (14 km) west of Exshaw, at 'The Gap'. They retired to the New Westminster, British Columbia area in 1943 or 1944.

Geography 
East of Exshaw are smaller company town communities of Kananaskis (lime plant), which is not the recreational area of the same name, and Seebe (power dam), which is now closed but proposed for future residential redevelopment. A small ranch area, now mainly dude ranches, is also near the hamlet. Of note is the Brewster's Kananaskis Ranch & Golf Course, which sits on the original homestead property of Bud Brewster and has remained in the family's possession since the 1880s.

A number of smaller parks with camping facilities have also developed in the east Bow Valley. Directly across the Bow River south from Exshaw is the Hamlet of Lac des Arcs although no bridge connects the two hamlets.

A dam on the Bow River is east of Seebe.

The smaller Exshaw Mountain, 1783 m (5850 ft.), is north of the hamlet, and is locally known as Cougar Mountain. Across from the community south beyond Lac des Arcs is Heart Mountain, known as an easier scramble. People often marry outdoors on this mountain because of the heart shape.

Exshaw Creek, locally known and identified on the Highway 1A bridge as Canyon Creek, runs through the hamlet. In 1958, Alan McGugan, et al., identified a new species of the pelecypod Megalodon in a river cliff of Exshaw Creek and gave the new specific name M. banffensis, for the proximity of the Banff area.

The eastern portion of the hamlet is on the flood plain for Jura (pronounced Yurah) Creek. In 1937, P.S. Warren described outcrops on the banks of Jura Creek, naming these the Exshaw Formation. The Jura Creek valley is known to provide a good introduction to some Front Range geology, with the exposed formations including the Palliser (Devonian), Exshaw and Banff (Mississippian). The naming of Jura Creek was from misidentified Jurassic fossils, which are actually Paleozoic, not Jurassic, in age.

Grotto Creek, 3 km west, has pictographs, including a possible "fluteplayer" Kokopelli image that may be from the Flute Clan of the Hopi tradition.

The local area is known for wildlife, despite the industrial development. Duncan MacGillivray, with explorer David Thompson on his survey of the Canadian Rockies, first encountered a bighorn sheep, near Exshaw, on 30 November 1800, which led to the specimens collected and subsequent scientific naming. Mount MacGillivray, to the west of Heart Mountain, is his namesake.

Demographics 

Administration 
Exshaw is the largest hamlet in the M.D. of Bighorn No. 8, which also includes the hamlets of Benchlands, Dead Man's Flats, Harvie Heights and Lac des Arcs, as well as rural ranchland west of Cochrane. The M.D. of Bighorn No. 8's municipal office is located in Exshaw.

See also 
List of communities in Alberta
List of designated places in Alberta
List of hamlets in Alberta

References

Further reading 

 Alexander, Rob, and Dene Cooper. Exshaw: Heart of the Valley. Exshaw, Alta: Exshaw Historical Society Centennial Project, 2005. 
 https://web.archive.org/web/20100825162358/http://www.geo.ucalgary.ca/DIY/jura1.htm
 McGugan, A. (1960). "A New Species of the Pelecypod Megalodon from the Permo-Carboniferous of the Banff Area, Alberta". Journal of Paleontology 34 (1): 101–106.

Municipal District of Bighorn No. 8
Hamlets in Alberta
Designated places in Alberta
Lime kilns in Canada